Frankweiler is a municipality in Südliche Weinstraße district, in Rhineland-Palatinate, western Germany. Its sister city is Cullman, Alabama, United States.

References

Municipalities in Rhineland-Palatinate
Palatinate Forest
Südliche Weinstraße
Palatinate (region)